Ochrodota brunnescens is a moth of the subfamily Arctiinae first described by Rothschild in 1909. It is found in French Guiana, Suriname and the Brazilian state of Amazonas.

References

Phaegopterina